Marcia Kilchenman O'Malley is an American mechanical engineer, the Thomas Michael Panos Family Professor in Mechanical Engineering and associate dean for research and innovation for the George R. Brown School of Engineering at Rice University. Her research concerns "systems for enhancing the human sensorimotor control system", including work on exoskeletons, neuroprosthetics, haptic technology, and brain–computer interfaces.

Education and career
O'Malley is a 1996 graduate of Purdue University, where she majored in mechanical engineering. She went to Vanderbilt University for graduate study, earning a master's degree in 1999 and completing her Ph.D. in 2001.

She has been on the Rice University faculty since 2001, and holds courtesy appointments in electrical and computer engineering and computer science at Rice, and in physical medicine and rehabilitation at the Baylor College of Medicine and University of Texas Health Science Center at Houston. Before being named the Thomas Michael Panos Family Professor, she was Stanley C. Moore Professor of Mechanical Engineering.

Recognition
O'Malley was named an ASME Fellow in 2014. In 2019 she was named an IEEE Fellow "for contributions to rehabilitation robotics and haptic systems", and in 2022 she was named a Fellow of the American Institute for Medical and Biological Engineering for her "outstanding contributions to rehabilitation robotics, haptics and robotic surgery".

In 2019, Purdue University gave her their Outstanding Mechanical Engineer Award. In 2020 she was named the ASME Dynamic Systems and Controls Division Nyquist Lecturer.

References

External links
Mechatronics and Haptic Interfaces lab

Living people
American mechanical engineers
American women engineers
Purdue University alumni
Vanderbilt University alumni
Rice University faculty
Fellows of the American Society of Mechanical Engineers
Fellow Members of the IEEE
1975 births